Dr. Prince Alex Harding (born in Freetown, Sierra Leone).
Harding was the Minister of Safety and Security from February 2001 to May 2002, when he became the Minister of Transport and Communications. He was also the secretary  general of the Sierra Leone People's Party. Harding was suspended from his post on 5 June 2007.

Excellence Award
On 5 May 2007, Harding was given an "award of excellence" by the "Bookish Klan of the Milton Margai College of Education and Technology, Goderich Campus, for his "immense contribution to National Development" particularly in his capacity as Minister of Transport and Communication during which tenure Sierra Leone has witnessed "an impact growth" in telecommunications".

2007 helicopter crash
See 2007 Paramount Airlines helicopter crash for main article
On 3 June 2007, a helicopter owned by Paramount Airlines crashed at Lungi International Airport outside of Freetown, killing 22 people, including the Togo Minister of Sport, Richard Attipoe. The 22 people were returning from a football match in Freetown where Togo beat Sierra Leone 1–0 in African Cup of Nations qualifiers. Harding, as the Minister of Transport and Communications, was held responsible for the crash and was suspended pending a governmental investigation.

Sources
 Minister suspended over air crash BBC News, 5 June 2007
 Dr. Harding Gets Excellence Award in Sierra Leone Awareness Times,  8 May 2007

Year of birth missing (living people)
Living people
Sierra Leone Creole people
People from Bo, Sierra Leone
Sierra Leone People's Party politicians
Government ministers of Sierra Leone